Cybeleia or Kybeleia or Cybellia was a city of ancient Ionia. Strabo, after saying that the mountain Mimas is between Erythrae and the Hypocremnus, adds, "then a village Cybellia, and the promontory Melaena." This is all that is known.

Its site is tentatively located near the modern Badembükü.

References

Populated places in ancient Ionia
Former populated places in Turkey